Rovio Entertainment Oyj (formerly Relude Oy and Rovio Mobile Oy and doing business internationally as the Rovio Entertainment Corporation) is a Finnish video game developer based in Espoo. Founded in 2003 by Helsinki University of Technology students Niklas Hed, Jarno Väkeväinen and Kim Dikert, the company is best known for the Angry Birds franchise. The company currently operates studios in Espoo, Stockholm, Copenhagen and Montreal.

The company's success has helped to establish Finland as a leading player in the mobile game industry, and has helped to create a thriving ecosystem for game development in the country.

History 
In 2003, three students from the Helsinki University of Technology, Niklas Hed, Jarno Väkeväinen and Kim Dikert, participated in a mobile game development competition at the Assembly demo party sponsored by Nokia and Hewlett-Packard. A victory with a mobile game called King of the Cabbage World led the trio to set up their own company, Relude. King of the Cabbage World was sold to Sumea, and renamed to Mole War, which became one of the first commercial real-time multiplayer mobile games. In January 2005, Relude received its first round of investment from a business angel, and the company changed its name to Rovio Mobile, where "rovio" translates from Finnish as "pyre".

In 2009, Mikael Hed became the CEO. In December 2009, Rovio released Angry Birds, its 52nd game, a puzzle game where a bird is flung at pigs using a slingshot for the iPhone; it reached No. 1 spot in the Apple App Store paid apps chart after six months, and remained charted for months after.

In March 2011, Rovio raised $42 million in venture capital funding from Accel Partners, Atomico and Felicis Ventures. In July 2011, the company changed its name to Rovio Entertainment. In June 2011, the company hired David Maisel to lead their Angry Birds movie production. By October 2011, Rovio purchased Kombo, a Helsinki-based animation company. The animation studio was acquired to produce a series of short videos released in 2012. In March 2012, Rovio acquired Futuremark Game Studios, the game development division of benchmarking company Futuremark, for an undisclosed sum.

In May 2012, Rovio announced that its game series Angry Birds had reached its one billionth download. In July 2012, Rovio announced a distribution partnership with Activision to bring the first three Angry Birds titles to video game consoles and handhelds, in a collection named Angry Birds Trilogy. It was released in September 2012. In November 2012, Rovio released Angry Birds Star Wars, an iteration of its popular game licensed from the Star Wars original trilogy, for mobile devices and PC. Rovio partnered with Activision again to port the title to video game consoles and handhelds, with it being released on those platforms in October 2013. A sequel, Angry Birds Star Wars II, based on the Star Wars prequel trilogy, was released in September 2013.

In March 2013, Rovio launched its multi-platform Toons.TV channel starting with Angry Birds Toons. As of 2013, Rovio became a video game publisher and is publishing third party games through its Rovio Stars program. The channel was discontinued in 2017.

In January 2014, Rovio announced that its game series Angry Birds had reached its two billionth download. In addition, it was revealed that their flagship series, Angry Birds, "leaked data" to third-party companies, possibly to surveillance agencies like the NSA. In retaliation, anti-NSA hackers defaced Rovio's website.

In May 2014, Rovio launched a new publishing arm, Rovio LVL11, to release experimental games. The first game published under Rovio LVL11 is Retry and the second is Selfie Slam. As of June 2014, Rovio considers themselves an entertainment company, not just a game company. This is reinforced by Rovio's merchandise and licensing business accounting for about half of their annual revenue of $216 million in 2013.

In August 2014, Rovio announced that Mikael Hed would step down as CEO in January 2015 in favour of Pekka Rantala. Hed remained on Rovio's board and became the chairman of Rovio Animation. In December 2014, Rovio laid off 110 employees after net profits halved in 2013 due to its recent games, Angry Birds Epic and Go!, which have not been that successful as past games. After this move, Rovio closed its Tampere studio, moving their operations to its Espoo location. At the end of 2014, Rovio suffered from a 73% decrease in profit, earning only €10 million. Pekka Rantala stated that the decrease is due to the poor sales of the licensed merchandise and the by-products of Angry Birds. He also noted that "the company are unsatisfied over the result of our licensing business". In August 2015, Rovio laid off 260 employees worldwide after Angry Birds toy and merchandise revenue fell by 43% during 2014. In December 2015, Rantala announced that he would step down as the CEO and would be succeeded by Kati Levoranta, former chief legal officer of Rovio, in January 2016.

On 16 January 2017, Rovio opened its new game studio in London to focus on massively multiplayer online games. On 15 February 2017, Rovio announced that it will be cutting at least 35 jobs as it restructures the animation division. In March 2017, Kaiken Entertainment, founded by former Rovio CEO Mikael Hed, acquired Rovio's animation division. In March 2017, Rovio reported that it has returned to profitability with a gross revenue of US$201 million with the success of the Angry Birds Movie and its recent video games.

In June 2017, Kaj Hed resigned as chairman of Rovio and Mika Ihamuotila succeeded him as new chairman.

On 5 September 2017, Rovio announced its intention to become a publicly-traded company. In October 2017, Rovio shares were sold at NASDAQ Helsinki and the company was valued at $1 billion.

On 2 March 2018, Rovio announced the closure of its London studio after disappointing results.

On 14 November 2018, Rovio announced that it appointed the former Gameloft executive Alexandre Pelletier-Normand as executive vice president of its game business unit. He started his role on January 2, 2019. On 30 November 2018, Rovio announced that they had fully acquired PlayRaven, the developer known for making strategy games such as Eve: War of Ascension.

On 3 June 2020, Rovio acquired Darkfire Games for an undisclosed sum. The subsidiary will become Rovio Copenhagen.

On 21 December 2020 Rovio announced that Executive Vice President of games, Alexandre Pelletier-Normand, would take over as CEO. The change went into effect on January 1, 2021. In 2021, the New Mexico attorney general filed a federal lawsuit against Rovio, alleging the company illegally collected and sold private personal data of users under thirteen to third party advertisers.

Games developed

2003–2009 
Prior to creating Angry Birds, Rovio developed 51 games, a combination of work-for-hire projects, publishing contracts and independently released titles.

 Bounce Boing Voyage - N-Gage  (2008)
 Bounce Evolution - Nokia N900 (2009)
 Bounce Tales - Java ME (2008)
 Bounce Touch - Symbian^1 (2008)
 Burger Rush - Java ME (2008)
 Burnout - Java ME (2007)
 Collapse Chaos - Java ME (2008)
 Cyber Blood - Java ME (2006)
 Darkest Fear - Java ME (2005), iOS (2009)
 Darkest Fear 2: Grim Oak - Java ME (2006)
 Darkest Fear 3: Nightmare - Java ME (2006)
 Desert Sniper - Java ME (2006)
 Dragon & Jade - Java ME (2007)
 Formula GP Racing - Java ME (2005)
 Gem Drop Deluxe - Java ME (2008)
 Marine Sniper - Java ME (2007)
 Mole War - Java ME (2004)
 Need for Speed: Carbon - Java ME (2006)
 Paid to Kill - Java ME (2004)
 Paper Planes - Java ME (2008)
 Patron Angel - Java ME (2007)
 Playman Winter Games - Java ME (2005)
 Shopping Madness - Java ME (2007)
 Space Impact: Meteor Shield - Nokia N97 (2010)
 Star Marine - Java ME (2007)
 Sumea Ski Jump - Java ME (2007)
 SWAT Elite Troops - Java ME (2008)
 Totomi - iOS, Flash, Java ME (2008)
 US Marine Corps Scout Sniper - Java ME (2006)
 War Diary: Burma - Java ME (2005)
 War Diary: Crusader - Java ME (2005)
 War Diary: Torpedo - Java ME  (2005)
 Wolf Moon - Java ME (2006)
 X Factor 2008 - Java ME (2008)

2009–present

Television series 
 Angry Birds Toons (2013–2016)
 Piggy Tales (2014–2019)
 Angry Birds Stella (2014–2016)
 Angry Birds Blues (2017)
 Angry Birds BirLd Cup (2018)
 Angry Birds Zero Gravity (2018)
 Angry Birds on the Run (2018–2020)
 Angry Birds MakerSpace (2019–present)
 Angry Birds Slingshot Stories (2020-2022)
 Angry Birds Bubble Trouble (2020–present)
 Angry Birds: Summer Madness (2022–present)

Feature films 
 The Angry Birds Movie (2016)
 The Angry Birds Movie 2 (2019)

References

External links 

 

 
Finnish companies established in 2003
Companies based in Espoo
Mobile game companies
2017 initial public offerings
Video game companies established in 2003
Video game companies of Finland
Video game development companies
Companies listed on Nasdaq Helsinki